Aygul Galimullina (born August 9, 1994, Kazan), professionally known as Diana Galimullina, is a Tatar fashion model from Kazan, Republic of Tatarstan, Russia. Galimullina has made appearances at shows for brands including Genny, Elisabetta Franchi, Cushnie et Ochs, Elie Saab, Blumarine, Chanel, Versace, Vivienne Westwood, Givenchy, Giorgio Armani, Brandon Maxwell, Prabal Gurung, Philipp Plein, Scotch & Soda.

Early life
Galimullina was born on August 9, 1994, in Kazan, Republic of Tatarstan. Her parents are Tatars, and she has an elder sister and brother. Her mother was a mathematics teacher, and her father has worked on constructing residential buildings. She completed her education at Kazan National Research Technical University. She finished musical school, where she played the piano.

At 16, she was booked to shoot for Vogue Russia as her first gig. When Vogue Russia came out, she signed with Next model agency worldwide (New York, Milan, and Paris).

Modeling career
Galimullina made her debut for fashion shows including Vivienne Westwood, Kenzo, and Calzedonia in 2013. Then in 2015, she began to work only for Christopher Kane and also closed the finale of his fashion show in London. After that, she signed with Women Management Worldwide (New York, Milan, and Paris).

After that, she worked with Donatella Versace for her Couture collection and archived to walk the Couture Versace show and ready-to-wear show.

Galimullina did a campaign for Versus Versace by Anthony Vaccarello. In addition, she also did the Versace Medusa bag campaign and Versace Home campaign. She was exclusive to the Givenchy by Ricardo Ticchi fashion show in Paris and other well-known models, including Bella Hadid, Irina Shayk, Mariacarla Boscono, and Natasha Poly. With that, she appeared in an Ermanno Scervino lingerie photoshoot. Then in 2019, Galimulina appeared in the Roberto Cavalli Sport campaign.

Galimullina has made appearances for fashion brands at several fashion shows that include Dolce & Gabbana, Genny, Elisabetta Franchi, Cushnie et Ochs, Elie Saab, Blumarine, Francesco Scognamiglio, Chanel, Versace, Givenchy, Giorgio Armani, Brandon Maxwell, Prabal Gurung, J. Mendel, Philipp Plein, Scotch & Soda, Christopher Kane, Moncler, John Richmond, Calzedonia, Y-3 by Yohji Yamamoto.

In 2019 she signed with Photogenics model agency in Los Angeles. As of 2022, she is working and living in Los Angeles, and also travels often to Europe for work and photoshoots.

References

External links

Living people
1994 births
People from Kazan
Kazan National Research Technical University alumni
Russian female models
Next Management models
Women Management models
Tatar people